The 128th Massachusetts General Court, consisting of the Massachusetts Senate and the Massachusetts House of Representatives, met in 1907 during the governorship of Curtis Guild Jr. William D. Chapple served as president of the Senate and John N. Cole served as speaker of the House.

Senators

Representatives

See also
 60th United States Congress
 List of Massachusetts General Courts

References

Further reading
 
 
 Who's who in State Politics, 1907

External links
 
 

Political history of Massachusetts
Massachusetts legislative sessions
massachusetts
1907 in Massachusetts